These are the official results of the men's 10,000 metres at the 1996 Summer Olympics in Atlanta, Georgia. The final was held on July 29, 1996.

Medalists

Records
These were the standing world and Olympic records (in minutes) prior to the 1996 Summer Olympics.

Haile Gebrselassie set a new Olympic record with 27:07.34 in the final.

Ranking

Final

Non-qualifiers

Qualification

Group 1

Group 2

See also
1995 Men's World Championships 10.000 metres
1997 Men's World Championships 10.000 metres
1998 Men's European Championships 10.000 metres

References

External links
 Official Report
 Results

1
10,000 metres at the Olympics
Men's events at the 1996 Summer Olympics